During the 2005–06 English football season, Leicester City F.C. competed in the Football League Championship.

Season summary
In the 2005–06 season, Leicester's dismal form continued which saw some fans call for Levein's resignation as the team were near the bottom of the table after ten matches, and fell into the relegation zone in January, ultimately leading to his sacking on Wednesday 25 January 2006, despite a 3–2 FA Cup win over Premiership club Tottenham just 17 days earlier.

After winning three out of four games as caretaker manager and moving the club five places up the league, Rob Kelly was appointed to see out the rest of the season. Kelly steered Leicester to safety and in April 2006 was given the manager's job on a permanent basis. Jim McCahill retired as chairman on 1 June 2006 and was replaced by Andrew Taylor.

Kit
Leicester City's kit was manufactured by English sports retailer JJB Sports and sponsored by Narborough-based bank Alliance & Leicester.

Final league table

Results summary

Results by round

Results
Leicester City's score comes first

Legend

Football League Championship

FA Cup

League Cup

Squad

Left club during season

2005–06 backroom staff
This section lists members of staff who were in Leicester's first team squad at any point during the 2005–06 season
Asterisks indicate member of staff left mid-season

Statistics

Appearances, goals and cards
(Starting appearances + substitute appearances)

Transfers

In

Out

Transfers in:  £1,925,000
Transfers out:  £2,375,000
Total spending:  £450,000

Loans in

Loans out

References

Leicester City F.C. seasons
Leicester City